Shamusilabi (also Romanized as Shamūsīlābī; also known as Shams ʿAlī Kandī and Shamū Salāvī) is a village in Qarah Quyun-e Jonubi Rural District, Qarah Quyun District, Showt County, West Azerbaijan Province, Iran. At the 2006 census, its population was 201, in 55 families.

References 

Populated places in Showt County